Tannerus is a small lunar impact crater that is located in the rugged southern highlands of the Moon. It lies within a couple of crater diameters of Asclepi to the northeast, and some distance due east of Jacobi.

The rim of this crater is very close to circular, with only a slight inward bulge along the north edge where it is joined to Tannerus P. The edge is sharp and well-defined, although there are tiny impacts along the rim in the west and south. The crater floor is level and free of markings or features of note.

Satellite craters
By convention these features are identified on lunar maps by placing the letter on the side of the crater midpoint that is closest to Tannerus.

References

 
 
 
 
 
 
 
 
 
 
 
 

Impact craters on the Moon